Touchstone (1831–1861) was a British bred Thoroughbred racehorse and a leading sire in Great Britain and Ireland on four occasions. He was owned and bred by Robert Grosvenor, 1st Marquess of Westminster, who bought him for the low price, at the time, of 600 guineas at the insistence of his chief stud groom Mr. Thomas Nutting.

Background
He was a brown colt, foaled in 1831, by Camel, his dam was the good broodmare, Banter, by Master Henry. Touchstone was a full brother to the St. Leger Stakes winner, Launcelot (br c 1837). Touchstone was described as a "peculiar horse" (according to The Druid), with an unusual conformation including fleshy legs and a thickened front ankle.  He was a frail foal with badly turned hocks that caused him to travel wide when moving. He measured 15 hands 2 inches and had strong hindquarters. Touchstone was unusual in having 19 dorsal vertebrae and a segment of a nineteenth rib on each side, which contributed to his long back.

He was conditioned for racing by the preeminent trainer of the day, John Scott, although Scott did not lay eyes on Touchstone until mid-way through his Classic season.

Racing career

Early career

Touchstone made his debut at Lichfield in the Produce Stakes, where he walked over. He then ran third to Queen Bess in the Champagne Stakes at the Holywell Hunt Meeting in October.

Classic season

Touchstone improved from his juvenile season to win five of his seven starts as a three-year-old. He debuted in the Dee Stakes at Chester in May, before following up in the Palatine Stakes the next day. In both races he beat Queen Bess, who had beaten him in the Champagne Stakes in 1833.

Touchstone did not run in the Derby (won by Plenipotentiary), and was next seen in the Liverpool St Leger, where he finished second to General Chassé after making the running. Despite this loss, trainer John Scott, who was seeing the horse for the first time, proclaimed that the horse would "carry off the St Leger", and ordered him to be brought to Malton in Yorkshire. Touchstone suffered an eventful journey, after his accompanying groom drank at too many inns and allowed the horse to escape into the wild. He was eventually caught by a seafarer and brought to Sheffield, but he was exhausted and in a bad way when he finally reached Scott's yard. He continued to train so badly that rider William Scott passed over the mount to George Calloway, a "country jockey".

Touchstone was sent off at 40/1 for the St Leger, as he faced not only his conqueror General Chassé, but the outstanding Derby winner Plenipotentiary, who many considered to be unbeatable. However, it was apparent afterwards that that horse had been poisoned, and Touchstone was able to record an easy two length victory.  So unexpected was the win, that Calloway "seemed perfectly thunderstruck" and "turned his head right and left to see whether the others had not all been swallowed up". The atmosphere after Touchstone's win was one of complete astonishment.

Touchstone ran three more times that year: winning at Wrexham, then finishing second in the Mostyn Stakes at Holywell Hunt before walking over in the Chieftain Stakes the very same day.

Career as an older horse

Touchstone won six of eight starts as a four-year-old, including a walk over in the Stand Cup at Chester, a Gold Candelabrum worth 300 sovereigns at Doncaster, a Gold Plate and Gold Cup at Heaton, and two races on the same day at the Holywell Hunt in October. He also finished sixth in the Trademen's Cup at Liverpool.

As a five-year-old Touchstone was undefeated, and counted the Ascot Gold Cup, Doncaster Cup and Heaton Park Gold Cup among his wins. In the Ascot Gold Cup, he was ridden by John Day to beat 1833 St Leger winner Rockingham, and in the Doncaster Cup he defeated the great mare Beeswing.

Touchstone made one start as a six-year-old in 1837, and recorded a second win in the Ascot Gold Cup, this time under William Scott.  The horse went to front at the turn before drawing away to beat Slane by an easy six lengths as the 1/2 favourite.

This was Touchstone's final race, and he retired to stud as the winner of fifteen of twenty-one starts with earnings of £5,475.

Stud record
Touchstone was initially retired to stud duty at Moor Park, near Rickmansworth in Hertfordshire, but then was brought to his owner's Eaton Stud in Cheshire. A major success as a stallion, Touchstone sired three Epsom Derby winners and was the leading sire in Great Britain and Ireland four times. Of the eight foals from the great racing mare Beeswing, five were sired by Touchstone.

His progeny included:
 Blue Bonnet (1839) – won the St. Leger Stakes
 Cotherstone (1840) – won the 2,000 Guineas and the Epsom Derby
 Flatcatcher (1845) – won 2,000 Guineas Stakes
 Lord of the Isles (1852) – won 2,000 Guineas 
 Mendicant (1843) – a filly who won the 1,000 Guineas and Epsom Oaks 
 Newminster (1848) – won St. Leger Stakes, Leading sire in Great Britain & Ireland in 1859 and 1863, sire of champion sires: Adventurer, Lord Clifden, and seven-time Leading Sire, Hermit
 Nunnykirk (1846) – won 2,000 Guineas, 2nd in the St. Leger Stakes
 Orlando (1841) – won the Epsom Derby, Leading sire in Great Britain & Ireland (1851, 1854, 1858)
 Surplice (1845) – won the Epsom Derby and St. Leger Stakes

As late as 1859 he was described as looking "fresh and well" and his box at Eaton was reported to be one of the attractions for visitors to the Chester agricultural show. Touchstone died in 1861 aged thirty at Eaton Stud.

Pedigree

References

External links
 Profile of Touchstone at Thoroughbred Heritage

1831 racehorse births
1861 racehorse deaths
Racehorses bred in the United Kingdom
Racehorses trained in the United Kingdom
British Champion Thoroughbred Sires
Thoroughbred family 14-a
St Leger winners